This page lists the World Best Year Performance in the year 2005 in both the men's and the women's hammer throw. The main event during this season were the 2005 World Athletics Championships in Helsinki, Finland, where the final of the men's competition was held on August 8, 2005. The women had their final four days later, on August 12, 2005.

Men

Records

2005 World Year Ranking

Women

Records

2005 World Year Ranking

References
IAAF
tilastopaja
apulanta
apulanta
hammerthrow.wz

2005
Hammer Throw Year Ranking, 2005